Heparan sulfate 6-sulfotransferases catalyses the transfer of sulfate from adenosine 3'-phosphate, 5'-phosphosulfate to the 6th position of the N-sulfoglucosamine residue in heparan sulfate.

Human proteins containing this domain 
 HS6ST1
 HS6ST2
 HS6ST3

References

EC 2.8.2
Protein domains
Protein families